The Poore Baronetcy, of Rushall in the County of Wiltshire, is a dormant title in the Baronetage of Great Britain. It was created on 8 July 1795 for John Methuen Poore, with remainder, failing heirs male of his own, to his brother Edward Poore and the heirs male of his body.

Poore baronets, of Rushall (1795)
Sir John Methuen Poore, 1st Baronet (1745–1820)
Sir Edward Poore, 2nd Baronet (1795–1838)
Sir Edward Poore, 3rd Baronet (1826–1893)
Sir Richard Poore, 4th Baronet (1853–1930)
Sir Edward Poore, 5th Baronet (1894–1938). He settled in Argentina.
Sir Herbert Edward Poore, 6th Baronet (1930–2004)
Sir Roger Ricardo Poore, 7th Baronet (born 1930)

References

Baronetcies in the Baronetage of Great Britain
Baronetcies created with special remainders
1795 establishments in Great Britain